The League of Lezhë, also commonly referred to as the Albanian League, was a military and diplomatic alliance of the Albanian aristocracy, created in the city of Lezhë on March 2, 1444. The League of Lezhë is considered the first unified independent Albanian country in the Medieval age, with Skanderbeg as leader of the regional Albanian chieftains and nobles united against the Ottoman Empire. Skanderbeg was proclaimed "Chief of the League of the Albanian People," while Skanderbeg always signed himself as "Dominus Albaniae" (Albanian: Zot i Arbërisë, English: Lord of Albania).

At the assembly of Lezha, members from the families Kastrioti, Arianiti, Zaharia, Muzaka, Spani, Thopia, and members of the Balsha and Crnojević which were linked matrilineally or via marriage to the Kastrioti, were present. The members contributed to the league with men and money while maintaining control of the internal affairs of their domains. Soon after its creation, the pro-Venetian Balšići and Crnojevići left the league in the events that led to the Albanian–Venetian War (1447–48). The peace treaty of the Albanian-Venetian war signed on October 4, 1448, is the first diplomatic document on which the league appears as an independent entity.  Barleti referred to the meeting as the generalis concilium or universum concilium ("general council" or "whole council"); the term "League of Lezhë" was coined by subsequent historians.

Background

After the death of Serbian Emperor Stefan Dušan in 1355, the magnates in Albania established their own dominions. When Ottoman forces entered Albania, they were faced with small principalities that were engaged in vicious fights among themselves. The first battle against the Ottoman forces in Albania was that of Balša II, the Lord of Zeta, when Karl Thopia invited the Ottomans, who defeated and killed Balša II in the battle of Savra, which happened on September 18, 1385.

In the 15th century, the Ottoman Empire established itself in the Balkans with no significant resistance offered by local Christian nobles. Many of them were still fighting amongst themselves and didn't see the Ottoman advance as a threat to their power. Although a civil war broke out between Bayezid I's sons in 1402–13, none of the Christian noblemen in the Balkans at the time seized the opportunity to repel the Ottomans; on the contrary, Bulgarians, Serbs, and Hungarians even helped the future Sultan Mehmed I seize power by participating as his allies in the final battle against his brother.  After the Ottoman civil war was over in favor of Mehmed I, his forces captured Kruja from the Thopia in 1415, Berat in 1417 from the Muzaka, Vlora and Kanina in 1417 from the widow of Balša III, and Gjirokastër in 1418 from the Zenevisi. Under pressure from the Ottoman Empire and the Republic of Venice, the Albanian Principalities began to vacillate. . Some Albanian nobility revolted in 1432–36.

In November 1443, Skanderbeg captured Kruja with his troops and declared its independence from the Sultan.

Formation

The League of Lezhë was founded on 2 March 1444 by:

 Lekë Zaharia (lord of Sati and Dagnum), and his vassals Pal and Nicholas Dukagjini
 Pjetër Spani (lord of the mountains behind Drivasto)
 Lekë Dushmani (lord of Minor Pult)
 Gjergj Strez, John and Gojko Balsha (lords of Misia, between Kruja and Lezhë)
 Andrea Thopia (lord of Scuria, between Tirana and Durrës) with his nephew Tanush
 Gjergj Arianiti
 Theodor Corona Muzaka
 Stefan Crnojević (lord of Upper Zeta)

Delegates from Venice were present at the meeting. The military alliance was made up of the feudal lords in Albania, who had to contribute to the league with men and money. Skanderbeg was proclaimed "Chief of the League of the Albanian People." Thus, he was the League's leader and commander-in-chief of its combined armed forces, which numbered 8,000 warriors. All the territorial lords had their own domains and affairs; "Skanderbeg had no right to interfere with the affairs of the domains of other nobles", acting only as the supreme military leader, as primus inter pares.  Barleti referred to the meeting as the generalis concilium or universum concilium ("general council" or "whole council"); the term "League of Lezhë" was coined by subsequent historians.

Initiated and organized under Venetian patronage, through treaties, the league was put under King Alfonso V, with Skanderbeg as captain general.

History
The League's forces had victories against the Ottomans at Torvioll (1444), Mokra (1445), Otonetë (1446), Oranik (1448), a loss at Svetigrad (1448) victory in Polog (1453), victory at Krujë (1450), Albulena (1457), Ohrid (1464), Mokra (1462) and many others.  

Skanderbeg's first big victory against the Ottomans was at the Battle of Torvioll, and the news of the victory of the Christians over the Muslims spread very quickly in Europe. In the two years that followed, the Albanian-Tetan coalition won over the Ottomans. On May 14, 1450, the first siege of Kruja began, which the Ottomans had to end the following year without success. In 1451, Skanderbeg formed an alliance with the Kingdom of Naples for the time being; however, the Albanians received no help from there. In 1452, the Ottomans were defeated at Mokrra and Meçadi. After the fall of Constantinople, Albanians received financial aid from Naples and Venice as well as from the Pope. Until 1462, Skanderbeg's troops were able to defeat the Ottomans every year without significantly weakening their superiority. Every year, the sultan was able to send a new army without difficulty. Only in 1460 and 1463 did ceasefires interrupt the fighting. In 1462, Skanderbeg succeeded in taking the important city of Ohrid.

In 1466 the second siege of Kruje Castle was knocked down. However, the Ottomans founded the fortress Elbasan south in the valley of the Shkumbin and thus finally settled in Albania. In 1467 a third siege of Kruje failed.

By 1468, the 10,000-strong Skanderbeg army could withstand the Ottomans. The Albanians received financial support from Venice and from the kings of Hungary and Naples. After Skanderbeg died in 1468, the Lezha League began to disintegrate. Following the Venetians, the Northern Albanians in particular continued the fight against the Ottomans. When the Shkodra, which until then had been dominated by the Venetians, was taken by the Ottomans in 1479, the resistance collapsed, and the entire Albanian settlement area was incorporated into the Ottoman Empire.

There was also a short war between Albania and Venice in 1447–1448, but on October 4, 1448, the Albanian–Venetian War ended when Skanderbeg and Nicholas Dukagjini signed a peace treaty with Venice, which would keep its possessions in Albania, including Dagnum, under the conditions that Venice pay a yearly sum of 1,400 ducats and that some league members would benefit from certain trade privileges, etc.

Dissolution and aftermath

The alliance was precarious. Though an official date of dissolution is unknown, the League of Lezhë fragmented soon after its founding, with many of its members breaking away. By 1450, it had certainly ceased to function as originally intended, and only the core of the alliance under Skanderbeg and Arianiti continued to fight against the Ottomans. Some members preferred to act in line with their own interests. During the attack on the sultan in 1450, they kept changing their position between supporting the Ottomans and joining Skanderbeg. After Pjetër Spani and Gjergj Dushmani left the alliance, and after the Arianiti and Dukagjini left it in 1450, members of the Dukagjini family concluded peace with the Ottoman Empire and even began to plot against Skanderbeg.

Skanderbeg commanders
 Gjergj Arianiti
 Nicholas Dukagjini, passed to the Ottomans in 1457
 Pal III Dukagjini, passed to the Ottomans in 1457
 Moisi Arianit Golemi, passed to the Ottomans in 1457
 Hamza Kastrioti, Skanderbeg's nephew, passed to the Ottomans in 1457
 Vladan Jurica, General Quartermaster Skanderbegs
 Vrana Konti
 Peter Perlatai
 Marin Spani
 Andrea Thopia
 Karl Muzak Thopia
 Tanush Thopia
 Ajdin Muzaka

For 25 years, from 1443–68, Skanderbeg's 10,000 man army marched through Ottoman territory winning against consistently larger and better supplied Ottoman forces. Threatened by Ottoman advances in their homeland, Hungary, and later Naples and Venice – their former enemies – provided the financial backbone and support for Skanderbeg's army. After Skanderbeg's death in 1468, the sultan "easily subdued Albania," but Skanderbeg's death did not end the struggle for independence.

Legacy

The League of Lezhë was the basis for an Albanian state. The formation of the League meant that for the first time, Albania was united under an Albanian leader. Some historians regard the League as an independent Albanian state. Others do not accept this view, saying that it was only a military league. [4] However, the League provided the basic elements of Albanian unity.

Skanderbeg and the League of Lezhë have become part of Albanian historiography. That period of history, categorized as a pre-communist time, is seen by many as mythical and unchallengeable. In these cases, struggles against the Ottoman Empire and other foreign powers and processes of national self-definition support the ideological framework linked to that period.

References

Sources

 

 

1444 establishments in Europe
1450 disestablishments in Europe
15th-century military alliances
Warfare by Skanderbeg
League of Lezhë
 
Former confederations